Santiago Amat Cansino (22 June 1887 – 5 November 1982) was a Spanish sailor who competed in the 1924 Summer Olympics, in the 1928 Summer Olympics, and in the 1932 Summer Olympics. In 1932 he won the bronze medal in the Snowbird class. He was Spanish national champion in the Snipe class three times (1944, 1946 and 1951).

References

External links
profile

1887 births
1982 deaths
Spanish male sailors (sport)
Olympic bronze medalists for Spain
Olympic medalists in sailing
Olympic sailors of Spain
Sailors at the 1924 Summer Olympics – Monotype
Sailors at the 1928 Summer Olympics – 12' Dinghy
Sailors at the 1932 Summer Olympics – Snowbird
Snipe class sailors
Real Club Marítimo de Barcelona sailors
Medalists at the 1932 Summer Olympics
20th-century Spanish people